Syberia is the seventh album by the Spanish alternative metal band Hamlet. This album has a slower tempos and more melodic sound than their previous works, with some elements of pop-rock. Syberia was mixed by Sergio Marcos at Sonora Estudios in Madrid and mastered by George Marino in Sterling Sound (New York, USA). It is the first album with bassist Álvaro Tenorio.

Track listing
 Para Toda Una Vida
 Aislados
 Dame una señal
 Imaginé
 Serenarme (en la desolación)
 Mi inmortalidad
 Contraproducente
 Desaparecer
 Tiempo
 En silencio
 Inestimable
 Resucitar

Members 
J. Molly - Vocals
Luis Tárraga - Lead guitar
Pedro Sánchez - Rhythm guitar
Álvaro Tenorio - Bass
Paco Sánchez - Drums

Sources 
Review in zona-zero
info of the album

2005 albums
Hamlet (band) albums
Locomotive Music albums
Alternative rock albums by Spanish artists